Five Fathom Bank light station was a station for lightvessels in New Jersey, United States. It was located off the south end of Five Fathom Bank, 14.7 miles and 100 degrees from the Cape May Lighthouse. The station was in service from 1837 to 1972 before ultimately being replaced by a horn buoy.

Service 
Records for lightvessels are incomplete.

On or about April 30, 1891, LV-40 was removed from its post on Five Fathom Bank and replaced by a schooner Drift, which temporarily would show a fixed white light on each masthead. Additionally, a buoy was used as an additional marker for the position while LV-40 was repaired.

In 1893, the USS New York (ACR-2) was performing sea trials and used the Five Fathom Bank light station and the North East End light station as markers to which it became the fastest armored vessel in the world. In 1894, the USS Minneapolis (C-13) again used the Five Fathom Bank light as a marker for its trial which it became the fastest armored vessel in the world.

On February 2, 1913, the Steamship Prinz Oskar and the schooner City of Georgetown collided and blamed the lightship for the accident. The City of Georgetown was heading towns the Cape Hatteras lightship in the southeast while the Prinz Oskar was heading in a circle to the northeast "in a great circle toward the transatlantic steamship route" with the Five Banks Light shone between the two vessels. Unable to see each other until it was too late, the Prinz Oskar collided with the ship and resulted in a large stove in its port bow, but the City of Georgetown was doomed and sank within 8 minutes. Captain A. J. Slocum and his crew of seven managed to get into their lifeboat and was taken aboard the Prinz Oskar and returned to Philadelphia for repair, listing to the starboard. The ship sank with its cargo of salt, of unlisted weight, but the ship's capacity was 1900 tons.

List of lightships by year

References 

Transportation buildings and structures in Cape May County, New Jersey
Lightship stations
Water transportation in New Jersey
Ships of the United States Lighthouse Service
1837 establishments in New Jersey
1972 disestablishments in New Jersey